Normanton by-election may refer to one of four parliamentary by-elections held in the British House of Commons constituency of Normanton in West Yorkshire:

1904 Normanton by-election
1905 Normanton by-election
1933 Normanton by-election
1947 Normanton by-election

See also
Normanton (UK Parliament constituency)